El Karama is a political party in Mauritania led by Cheikhna Ould Mohamed Ould Hajbou.

History
The party won six seats in the 2013 parliamentary elections.

References

Political parties in Mauritania